Legislative elections were held in the Åland Islands on 16 October 2011. All 30 seats were up for election for a four-year term. Members were elected by proportional representation.

Results

References

Elections in Åland
Aland
Aland
Aland